Abu Tarfaiyeh (also Romanized as Abū Ţarfā’īyeh and Abū Tarfāyeh; also known as Abū Ţarfāyeh-ye Pā’īn) is a village in Chah Salem Rural District, in the Central District of Omidiyeh County, Khuzestan Province, Iran. At the 2006 census, its population was 33, in 6 families.

References 

Populated places in Omidiyeh County